WUVN (channel 18) is a television station licensed to Hartford, Connecticut, United States, serving the Hartford–New Haven television market as an affiliate of the Spanish-language Univision network. It is owned by Entravision Communications alongside low-power, Class A UniMás affiliate WUTH-CD (channel 47). The two stations share studios at Constitution Plaza in downtown Hartford and transmitter facilities on Birch Mountain Road in Glastonbury, Connecticut.

WUVN operates a low-powered semi-satellite in Springfield, Massachusetts, WHTX-LD (channel 24), which airs the same programming as provided by its parent but airs separate commercial inserts and station identifications. WHTX-LD's transmitter is located on Provin Mountain in the Feeding Hills section of Agawam, Massachusetts; aside from that, it does not maintain any facilities in Springfield or Holyoke. Master control and other internal operations for WHTX-LD are based at WUVN's studios.

History
WUVN is one of the oldest UHF stations in New England. It began operation on October 2, 1954, as WGTH-TV, a primary ABC/secondary DuMont affiliate. The station was initially owned by a partnership of The Hartford Times and General Teleradio, along with WGTH radio (1410 AM, now WPOP), but was sold to CBS in 1956, shortly after Hartford and New Haven were merged into a single market. The station's call letters were changed to WHCT, for "Hartford, Connecticut" (or alternatively, "Hartford Christian Television", during its time as an affiliate for Faith Broadcasting Network).

As a CBS station, WHCT's ratings were low because television sets were not required to have UHF tuners until 1964. Even with a very expensive converter, UHF signals were very unclear at the time. In 1957, Travelers Insurance Company, owners of WTIC-AM-FM, signed on WTIC-TV on channel 3. By 1958, CBS had concluded that it was better to have its programming on a VHF station, even if it was only an affiliate. It moved its Hartford affiliation to WTIC-TV, and sold WHCT to a group led by Edward Taddei, which turned it into an independent station. Channel 3, which is now WFSB, has been Hartford's CBS affiliate ever since then. Two years later, what had become RKO General retook ownership of the station, this time without the involvement of the Times.

As an independent, WHCT's schedule consisted of cartoons, movies, off-network sitcoms and dramas, sports (including New York Mets baseball games), public affairs programming, and religious shows. However, it never really thrived, even with the addition of all-channel tuning. Beginning in 1962, the station ran a subscription television service from 7:00 p.m. to midnight, with first-run movies and sports events from Madison Square Garden. A decade before the 1972 launch of pay cable network HBO, WHCT's programming was an experiment between RKO and Zenith, who provided the "Phonevision" descrambler boxes. WHCT could be seen by all viewers with a UHF tuner and antenna during regular broadcast hours, but viewers needed a decoder box in order to view the signal during the subscription television block. The first pay-TV movie was Sunrise at Campobello, starring Ralph Bellamy and Greer Garson. The subscription television service could only broadcast in black and white, despite the fact that many of the movies shown were made in color. It was deemed a failure, and RKO dropped it early in 1968. By then, the station had slashed its operating hours, signing on at 1 p.m. and signing off late at night. The future host of CBS News Sunday Morning from 1994 to 2016, Charles Osgood, was general manager of the station. By 1970, the station was signing on at 10 a.m. and had a moderate amount of then-strong programming, including Gilligan's Island, The Dick Van Dyke Show, McHale's Navy, Mister Ed, Bugs Bunny, The Fugitive, The Untouchables and What's My Line?, as well as the RKO film library. They also ran Romper Room, which was produced at then-sister station WOR-TV in New York.

In 1971, RKO put the station up for sale, but after failing to receive a financially significant offer, they donated the station in February 1972 to California's Faith Center, led by Reverend Ray Schoch, an ordained minister by the Assemblies of God. At the time, Faith Center was a Christian TV ministry with a TV network, Faith Broadcasting Network, similar to the more well-known Christian Broadcasting Network, of the Evangelical Pentecostal denomination. They produced some of their own programming while also selling time to like-minded outside ministries. Under Schoch, the station began to air religious programming in the morning and late evening hours, while continuing to air general entertainment programming from noon to 8 p.m. and again after 10 p.m. The religious shows consisted of several national televangelists, as well as programming featuring Pastor Schoh himself. The plan was for WHCT to remain commercial, unlike Faith Center's Los Angeles and San Francisco stations. WHCT also broadcast games of the World Hockey Association's New England Whalers. In 1974, WHCT added daily runs of The PTL Club and The 700 Club to their lineup and was about half-religious and half-secular by 1975.

Dr. Eugene Scott joined the ministry as a financial consultant in 1974 and assistant to Schoch early in 1975. That year, Pastor Schoch became ill and retired from the ministry full-time, and Dr. Scott (who by then had left the Assemblies of God and whose religious views were changing) took over station operations. Under Scott, WHCT was put up for sale and almost sold to the Christian Broadcasting Network. Plans would have been for WHCT to become a stronger independent general entertainment station. But for various reasons the sale was aborted in 1976. That year, as shows expired, WHCT did not renew them and gradually added more religious programming, with only some low-budget secular shows. The hours on the air also declined to about 8 hours a day. Sister stations KVOF and KHOF also began to decline as well under Scott. Pastor Schoch died in 1977, by which time movies were gone from the WHCT schedule, as were cartoons.

WHCT was almost exclusively religious by 1978 and all religious by 1979, with Gene Scott's programming taking up their 6-hour or so broadcast day. The station's transmitter was damaged late in 1979, forcing it to broadcast at low power. As a result, religious groups stopped buying time on WHCT, and the station had no money to make any programming investments or fully repair the transmitter. By 1981, the station aired Dr. Scott's shows full-time during hours in the day the station was on the air. Scott, whose views had changed from Conservative, Evangelical and Pentecostal to more libertarian militant views, would provide rambling discourses on wide-ranging topics.

WHCT was put up for a "distress" sale in 1981, with the stipulation from the Federal Communications Commission (FCC) that the station be sold to minority ownership. After some legal wrangling, Astroline Communications took ownership of the station in 1984, took the station dark upon taking over, replaced the transmitter, and put WHCT back on the air in September 1985 with a lineup of movies, reruns, and syndicated programming not shown on the other two Connecticut independents, WTXX (channel 20, now WCCT-TV) and WTIC-TV (channel 61). The station also once again carried what was by then the Hartford Whalers, who were part of the National Hockey League, from 1986 until 1990. The station ran a mix of older sitcoms, older movies, drama shows, and a small number of children's programs. Beginning in August 1986, WHCT also ran Home Shopping Network overnights from 1 to 6 a.m. However, WHCT continued to underperform in the ratings, due to formidable competition and better lineups offered by WTXX and WTIC. Hartford–New Haven was not big enough at the time, then as now, to support three independent stations. It did not help matters that New York City's three major independents–WNEW-TV (now WNYW), WOR-TV (now WWOR-TV) and WPIX, as well as Boston's WSBK-TV and WLVI–were all available on cable, and as the FCC's SyndEx rules did not go into effect until 1990, WHCT had no method to stop their ratings from being cannibalized by those regional superstations. WTIC-TV also had its share of financial problems, and dropped a number of shows that WHCT picked up. However, these programs did not help WHCT at all and put the station deeper into debt. Much of the financial problems came as a result of challenges to WHCT's license, as Gene Scott was supposed to sell the station at market value to minority owners, but challengers alleged that this was not the case because minorities did not have voting stock in the station. Additionally, issues with former owner RKO also played a role in the legal matters. Legal fees, while not the only problem, did play a role in preventing the station from really growing.

By the spring of 1989, WHCT was in serious financial trouble. Syndicated shows were pulled off the station daily because program distributors were not being paid; much of this programming would migrate to New London station WTWS (channel 26, now WHPX-TV). With the station's finances and program supply dwindling, WHCT gradually increased the amount of paid programming and infomercials on its schedule, to the point where it ultimately ran them for 6 hours a day. They also ran the Home Shopping Network about 12 hours a day and some low-budget movies and drama shows about 6 hours a day. Finally, in 1990, WHCT filed for Chapter 11 bankruptcy. On April 4, 1991, the bankruptcy filing was converted to Chapter 7, and soon afterwards the station was ordered off the air by the Federal Bankruptcy Court, with its equipment repossessed to satisfy the creditors' demands. On April 9, WHCT ceased operations.

Two if By Sea Broadcasting attempted to purchase the station in 1993, but its application was tied up in a license renewal dispute between Astroline and Shurberg Broadcasting, in which Shurberg alleged that Astroline had misrepresented itself as a minority broadcaster in order to purchase the station. In the meantime, WHCT stayed dark until February 5, 1997, when the bankruptcy trustee for Astroline, to avoid the license being automatically canceled by the FCC on February 9, put the station back on the air with programming provided by Paxson Communications (which sold WTWS soon afterward). The FCC designated WHCT's license for hearing that April. Paxson's inTV service was dropped from WHCT in June 1998 in favor of Shop at Home Network programming, and the Pax TV affiliation for Hartford ultimately went to the renamed WHPX (though WHCT still carried some Worship Network programming, as well as Boston Red Sox games declined by WBNE (channel 59, now WCTX), in addition to Shop at Home). Another affiliation change took place in January 1999, when the station affiliated with ValueVision (now ShopHQ).

The Astroline-Shurberg dispute continued even after an administrative law judge approved WHCT's license renewal and the sale to Two if By Sea in 1999, as Shurberg raised concerns about that company's qualifications. As a result, the following year, Entravision Communications proposed to purchase the station for $18 million, to be split between Shurberg, Two if By Sea, and Astroline. Although Entravision's offer was itself briefly threatened by both a separate dispute with Barbara Laurence, in which Laurence attempted to obtain a 10 percent stake in WHCT, as well as WNTO (now WVEN-TV) in Daytona Beach, Florida, by alleging that she found the stations for Entravision, and a complaint from Astroline general partner Richard Ramirez over a payment by the bankruptcy trustee to Shurberg, it was eventually approved; the station changed its call letters to WUVN that December, and dropped ValueVision in favor of Univision's Spanish-language programming on April 1, 2001. Since then, WUVN has largely been a semi-satellite of Boston's WUNI.

WHTX-LD history
WHTX-LD has its origins in W10CG, a low-power station on channel 10 in Hartford that signed on in February 1997, became WHTX-LP on March 31, and shut down in December 1998 to make room for WTNH (channel 8)'s digital signal; its programming from America One and the American Independent Network moved to former simulcast partner WMLD-LP (channel 6, now WRNT-LD on channel 32). As the station did not return to the air within a year of going dark, the license was deemed to have expired by the Federal Communications Commission on October 11, 2002. However, original owner Harvard Broadcasting claimed to the FCC that WHTX had briefly resumed operations on an annual basis, and the license was reinstated a month later; it was sold to Entravision soon thereafter. Entravision moved the station to channel 43 in Springfield, and signed the new WHTX-LP on the air in November 2003 as a semi-satellite of WUVN. WHTX was picked up by Comcast's Springfield-area systems on July 10, 2006, replacing the national Univision feed.

Soon after WHTX made its move, however, Meredith Corporation filed an objection, stating that the station's claimed resumptions were not enough to avoid the automatic expiration of its license, and that there were sufficient channels available in the Hartford area for WHTX to use to accommodate WTNH. As a result, the move was never formally granted even a construction permit, and was operated by a series of special temporary authority grants; on March 9, 2009, the FCC overturned the reinstatement of the WHTX license and revoked its operating authority. Nonetheless, its programming continued to remain available on cable and on WUVN's digital channel 18.2. After finding that there was insufficient evidence to prove that WHTX-LP had in fact failed to operate for twelve consecutive months, the FCC again reinstated the station's license on November 3, 2014, and directed Entravision to file a new displacement application; on November 7, it filed to construct a digital companion channel for WHTX, again specifying operation on channel 43 in Springfield. The WHTX-LD signal was licensed on September 29, 2015.

Newscasts

In the station's early years, WGTH-TV aired a local newscast, hiring away Charles Norwood from WNHC-TV (now WTNH). WHCT made another attempt at a news operation for a short time in 1969, experimenting with a 10 p.m. newscast anchored by Pat Sheehan (another attempt at a 10 p.m. newscast would not be attempted until 20 years later, when WTIC-TV launched such a newscast, itself anchored at first by Sheehan).

Upon the sale to Entravision, the company announced that it would launch a Spanish-language local news operation on WUVN. However, a full-scale news operation has not launched , and channel 18 has simulcast WUNI's newscast, Noticias Univision Nueva Inglaterra (Univision News New England), since the program's launch on April 1, 2003 (though WUVN again raised the possibility of a local newscast in 2006).

Technical information
The stations' digital signals are multiplexed:

See also

RKO Pictures
RKO General
Eugene Scott
Faith Broadcasting Network

References

External links

Advertising information site (from WUVN owner Entravision)
WUVN's tower and transmitters
History of the old WHCT, by former staff member Kyle Bookholz
WHCT acquired by the Faith Broadcasting Network in the early 70's

Univision network affiliates
RKO General
Television channels and stations established in 1954
UVN-LD
Entravision Communications stations
1954 establishments in Connecticut